In Greek mythology, the name Iphthime  (Ancient Greek: Ἰφθίμη Iphthīmē) refers to:

Iphthime, daughter of Icarius, a sister of Penelope and Perileos. She became the wife of Eumelus from Pherae and possibly, the mother of his son, Zeuxippus. In Homer's Odyssey, Athena creates an image in Iphthime's likeness and sends this to a sleeping Penelope. This image conveys encouragement to Penelope after the latter confides in it her worries for her husband Odysseus and her son Telemachus. Scholiasts on Homer inform that she was also known under several other names: Hypsipyle, Mede, Laodice or Laodamia, and that her mother was Asterodia.
Iphthime, daughter of Dorus, mother of the Satyrs Lycus, Pherespondus and Pronomus by Hermes.

See also 
 16974 Iphthime, Trojan asteroid

Notes

References 

 Homer, The Odyssey with an English Translation by A.T. Murray, PH.D. in two volumes. Cambridge, MA., Harvard University Press; London, William Heinemann, Ltd. 1919. . Online version at the Perseus Digital Library. Greek text available from the same website.
 Nonnus of Panopolis, Dionysiaca translated by William Henry Denham Rouse (1863-1950), from the Loeb Classical Library, Cambridge, MA, Harvard University Press, 1940.  Online version at the Topos Text Project.
 Nonnus of Panopolis, Dionysiaca. 3 Vols. W.H.D. Rouse. Cambridge, MA., Harvard University Press; London, William Heinemann, Ltd. 1940-1942. Greek text available at the Perseus Digital Library.

Women in Greek mythology
Characters in the Odyssey
Laconian characters in Greek mythology
Thessalian mythology